Brindavani Sarang or Brindabani Sarang,  also known as raga Sarang, is a Hindustani classical raga. It is also called Vridavani Sarang. This raga falls under the category of Sarang ragas.

Theory 
Brindabani Sarang is a Kafi thaat raga. It was created by Swami Haridas. The associated mythology being that he brought Lord Krishna to earth by singing this raga who took the form of an idol which can still be seen in Mathura. 
One of the famous Ragas for the Sarang , it is a popular  of this family, together with Shuddha Sarang, and Madhyamad Sarang.
The name Brindavani Sarang is a testament to its popularity in the region around Mathura.

The notes Ga and Dha are not used in this raga. 
A characteristic of all Sarang is the way Rishab (Re) is sung. The Rishabh is not accorded embellishments, so it is sung without any meenḍ of adjacent swaras neither with any andolan. This preeminence of Re makes the swar the vadi of this Raga as also for all other varieties of this family.

Another dominant phrase is Sa - Ni - Pa, also used in many other ragas, notably the popular Kanhada family. 
The distinguishing factor being that the Ni in Kanhada's S-N-P takes a kaṇ of the Pa (of ), with a  effect, whereas the Ni of Sa-Ni-Pa in Sarang is rendered pure.

Brindavani Sarang's classification in thaat Kaafi is peculiar as it uses the shuddha form of "Ni" in its Aaroha, whereas the  form of "ni" and "ga" is the main characteristic of the Kaafi thaat. So it is possible to make a mistake in identifying its thaat as Khamaj.

This raga evokes the sringara rasa - romantic love.

Aroha and Avaroha 

Arohana: N S R M P N S'

Avarohana: 

Ni svara is Shuddha in Arohana and Komal in Avarohana.

Vadi and Samavadi 

Vadi: Rishabha (re)

Samavadi: Panchama (pa)

Pakad or Chalan
Ni Sa Re Ma Re Pa Ma Re Ni Sa

R M P n - PMR, M- R N S R-S

Organisation and relationships
Thaat: Kafi Thaat

Samay (Time) 
Madhyanah (noon), Afternoon.

It is generally sung as Rajasthani folksongs.

Seasonality

Rasa
Shringar Rasa: The Rasa of Romance. It creates a romantic and mystic atmosphere.

Related Raga 
Madhumad Sarang has the Shuddha Ni dropped or Varjit (excluded). It is still considered a chanchal raga. 
Another distinguishing factor is that while Rishabh is used extensively in Megh Malhar (as also in Sarang), the Rishabh there takes a very strong meenḍ from Madhyam (Me), a salient in the singing of meenḍ-heavy Megh.

Carnatic compositions 
Kamalaptakula by Tyagaraja

 and Rangapura Vihara by Muthuswami Deekshithar

Aathma Nivedanam by Thulaseevanam

Eke mamathe kottu by Gopala Dasa in Kannada

Arige Vadhuvade By Purandara Dasa

Ranga banda brindavanadalli by Vyasatirtha in KannadaAnanda Mayage By Vadiraja TirthaIko Node Ranganathana By SripadarajaAmburuhânanâ by Kalyani VaradarajanKaliyuga Varadhan by Periyasami ThooranThillana in Brindavani Sarang by M. Balamuralikrishna

 Film songs 
 Tamil language 

 Hindi language 

 Malayalam language 

 Telugu language 

Other songs

References

Bor, Joep (ed). Rao, Suvarnalata; der Meer, Wim van; Harvey, Jane (co-authors) The Raga Guide: A Survey of 74 Hindustani Ragas''. Zenith Media, London: 1999.

External links
 SRA on Samay and Ragas
 SRA on Ragas and Thaats
 Rajan Parrikar on Ragas
 Film Songs in Rag Brindavani Sarang
 More details about raga Brindavani Sarang

Hindustani ragas
Janya ragas (kharaharapriya)